Geumho-dong may refer to 

Geumho-dong, Seoul
Geumho-dong, Gwangju